The 2019–20 Portland Trail Blazers season was the franchise's 50th season in the National Basketball Association (NBA). The Trail Blazers entered the season following a playoff defeat from the Golden State Warriors in the Western Conference Finals.

The season was suspended by the league officials following the games of March 11 after it was reported that Rudy Gobert tested positive for COVID-19.

On June 4, the Trail Blazers were one of 22 teams invited to the NBA Bubble.

On August 15, the Trail Blazers clinched the 8th seed after defeating the Memphis Grizzlies in a play-in game. With the Blazers clinching a playoff berth, this was the 3rd consecutive season where 4 of 5 teams in the Northwest Division clinched the playoffs.

Despite their first losing season since the 2012–13 season, the Trail Blazers were tied at 7 seasons with the defending champion Toronto Raptors with the 2nd most active playoff streak behind the Houston Rockets.

The Trail Blazers faced off against the Los Angeles Lakers in the first round of the playoffs, marking the first meeting between the two teams in the playoffs since 2002. Despite a strong Game 1 victory, Damian Lillard was forced to leave the bubble after suffering a right knee injury in Game 4, and the Trail Blazers lost the series in 5 games. Like in 2002, the Lakers went on to win the championship.

Draft picks

Roster

Standings

Division

Conference

Game log

Preseason
The preseason schedule was announced on July 29, 2019.

|- style="background:#fcc"
| 1
| October 8
| Denver
| 
| Mario Hezonja (12)
| Skal Labissière (12)
| Lillard, McCollum, Labissière, Hezonja, Simons (2)
| Veterans Memorial Coliseum10,942
| 0–1
|- style="background:#cfc;"
| 2
| October 10
| Maccabi Haifa
| 
| Anfernee Simons (22)
| Skal Labissière (15)
| London Perrantes (6)
| Moda Center12,157
| 1–1
|- style="background:#fcc;"
| 3
| October 12
| Phoenix
| 
| CJ McCollum (27)
| Skal Labissière (8)
| Hezonja, Collins (5)
| Moda Center18,468
| 1–2
|- style="background:#cfc;"
| 4
| October 16
| @ Utah
| 
| CJ McCollum (28)
| Hassan Whiteside (11)
| Lillard, McCollum (4)
| Vivint Smart Home Arena17,513
| 2–2
|- style="background:#fcc;"
| 5
| October 17
| @ Denver
| 
| Mario Hezonja (18)
| Zach Collins (11)
| Mario Hezonja (6)
| Pepsi Center14,484
| 2–3

Regular season 

|- style="background:#fcc;"
| 1
| October 23
| Denver
| 
| Damian Lillard (32)
| Hassan Whiteside (19)
| Damian Lillard (8)
| Moda Center19,991
| 0–1
|- style="background:#cfc;"
| 2
| October 25
| @ Sacramento
| 
| Damian Lillard (35)
| Hassan Whiteside (9)
| Lillard, Collins, Bazemore (5)
| Golden 1 Center17,583
| 1–1
|- style="background:#cfc;"
| 3
| October 27
| @ Dallas
| 
| CJ McCollum (35)
| Hassan Whiteside (14)
| Damian Lillard (5)
| American Airlines Center19,707
| 2–1
|- style="background:#fcc;"
| 4
| October 28
| @ San Antonio
| 
| Damian Lillard (28)
| Anthony Tolliver (10)
| Damian Lillard (7)
| AT&T Center18,083
| 2–2
|- style="background:#cfc;"
| 5
| October 30
| @ Oklahoma City
| 
| Damian Lillard (23)
| Hassan Whiteside (12)
| Damian Lillard (12)
| Chesapeake Energy Arena18,203
| 3–2

|- style="background:#fcc;"
| 6
| November 2
| Philadelphia
| 
| Damian Lillard (33)
| Mario Hezonja (12)
| Damian Lillard (9)
| Moda Center19,441
| 3–3
|- style="background:#fcc;"
| 7
| November 4
| @ Golden State
| 
| Damian Lillard (39)
| Hassan Whiteside (11)
| CJ McCollum (6)
| Chase Center18,064
| 3–4
|- style="background:#fcc;"
| 8
| November 7
| @ L. A. Clippers
| 
| McCollum, Lillard (22)
| Hassan Whiteside (19)
| Damian Lillard (6)
| Staples Center19,068
| 3–5
|- style="background:#fcc;"
| 9
| November 8
| Brooklyn
| 
| Damian Lillard (60)
| Hassan Whiteside (15)
| Damian Lillard (5)
| Moda Center20,089
| 3–6
|- style="background:#cfc;"
| 10
| November 10
| Atlanta
| 
| Damian Lillard (30)
| Hassan Whiteside (12)
| Damian Lillard (6)
| Moda Center20,041
| 4–6
|- style="background:#fcc;"
| 11
| November 12
| @ Sacramento
| 
| Damian Lillard (27)
| Hassan Whiteside (7)
| Damian Lillard (5)
| Golden 1 Center16,358
| 4–7
|- style="background:#fcc;"
| 12
| November 13
| Toronto
| 
| Rodney Hood (25)
| Whiteside, Labissiere (9)
| Damian Lillard (10)
| Moda Center19,544
| 4–8
|- style="background:#cfc;"
| 13
| November 16
| @ San Antonio
| 
| CJ McCollum (32)
| Hassan Whiteside (12)
| CJ McCollum (7)
| AT&T Center18,534
| 5–8
|- style="background:#fcc;"
| 14
| November 18
| @ Houston
| 
| CJ McCollum (25)
| Hassan Whiteside (8)
| Damian Lillard (11)
| Toyota Center18,055
| 5–9
|- style="background:#fcc;"
| 15
| November 19
| @ New Orleans
| 
| CJ McCollum (22)
| Hassan Whiteside (14)
| CJ McCollum (5)
| Smoothie King Center15,021
| 5–10
|- style="background:#fcc;"
| 16
| November 21
| @ Milwaukee
| 
| CJ McCollum (37)
| Skal Labissière (12)
| CJ McCollum (10)
| Fiserv Forum17,385
| 5–11
|- style="background:#fcc;"
| 17
| November 23
| @ Cleveland
| 
| Damian Lillard (23)
| Damian Lillard (8)
| Damian Lillard (8)
| Rocket Mortgage FieldHouse19,432
| 5–12
|- style="background:#cfc;"
| 18
| November 25
| @ Chicago
| 
| Carmelo Anthony (25)
| Hassan Whiteside (12)
| Damian Lillard (12)
| United Center18,776
| 6–12
|- style="background:#cfc;"
| 19
| November 27
| Oklahoma City
| 
| Damian Lillard (27)
| Hassan Whiteside (16)
| Damian Lillard (5)
| Moda Center19,870
| 7–12
|- style="background:#cfc;"
| 20
| November 29
| Chicago
| 
| Damian Lillard (28)
| Hassan Whiteside (15)
| Damian Lillard (6)
| Moda Center20,139
| 8–12

|- style="background:#fcc;"
| 21
| December 3
| @ L. A. Clippers
| 
| CJ McCollum (20)
| Hassan Whiteside (13)
| Damian Lillard (7)
| Staples Center19,068
| 8–13
|- style="background:#cfc;"
| 22
| December 4
| Sacramento
| 
| CJ McCollum (33)
| Hassan Whiteside (16)
| Damian Lillard (10)
| Moda Center19,393
| 9–13
|- style="background:#fcc;"
| 23
| December 6
| L. A. Lakers
| 
| Damian Lillard (29)
| Hassan Whiteside (10)
| Damian Lillard (8)
| Moda Center19,912
| 9–14
|- style="background:#fcc;"
| 24
| December 8
| Oklahoma City
| 
| Damian Lillard (26)
| Hassan Whiteside (10)
| Damian Lillard (7)
| Moda Center19,393
| 9–15
|- style="background:#cfc;"
| 25
| December 10
| New York
| 
| Damian Lillard (31)
| Hassan Whiteside (15)
| Damian Lillard (6)
| Moda Center19,393
| 10–15
|- style="background:#fcc;"
| 26
| December 12
| @ Denver
| 
| Hassan Whiteside (33)
| Hassan Whiteside (11)
| Damian Lillard (11)
| Pepsi Center18,828
| 10–16
|- style="background:#cfc;"
| 27
| December 16
| @ Phoenix
| 
| CJ McCollum (30)
| Hassan Whiteside (14)
| CJ McCollum (6)
| Talking Stick Resort Arena14,193
| 11–16
|- style="background:#cfc;"
| 28
| December 18
| Golden State
| 
| Damian Lillard (31)
| Hassan Whiteside (23)
| Damian Lillard (13)
| Moda Center19,393
| 12–16
|- style="background:#cfc;"
| 29
| December 20
| Orlando
| 
| Damian Lillard (36)
| Hassan Whiteside (17)
| Damian Lillard (6)
| Moda Center19,393
| 13–16
|- style="background:#cfc;"
| 30
| December 21
| Minnesota
| 
| Damian Lillard (29)
| Hassan Whiteside (22)
| Damian Lillard (7)
| Moda Center19,393
| 14–16
|- style="background:#fcc;"
| 31
| December 23
| New Orleans
| 
| Carmelo Anthony (23)
| Hassan Whiteside (16)
| Damian Lillard (7)
| Moda Center19,499
| 14–17
|- style="background:#fcc;"
| 32
| December 26
| @ Utah
| 
| Damian Lillard (34)
| Anfernee Simons (10)
| Damian Lillard (8)
| Vivint Smart Home Arena18,306
| 14–18
|- style="background:#fcc;"
| 33
| December 28
| L. A. Lakers
| 
| Damian Lillard (31)
| Hassan Whiteside (16)
| Damian Lillard (9)
| Moda Center19,960
| 14–19
|- style="background:#fcc;"
| 34
| December 30
| Phoenix
| 
| Damian Lillard (33)
| Hassan Whiteside (22)
| Damian Lillard (7)
| Moda Center19,896
| 14–20

|- style="background:#fcc;"
| 35
| January 1
| @ New York
| 
| Carmelo Anthony (26)
| Hassan Whiteside (12)
| Damian Lillard (8)
| Madison Square Garden19,812
| 14–21
|- style="background:#cfc;"
| 36
| January 3
| @ Washington
| 
| Damian Lillard (35)
| Hassan Whiteside (21)
| CJ McCollum (6)
| Capital One Arena17,945
| 15–21
|- style="background:#fcc;"
| 37
| January 5
| @ Miami
| 
| Damian Lillard (34)
| Hassan Whiteside (18)
| Damian Lillard (12)
| American Airlines Arena19,846
| 15–22
|- style="background:#cfc;"
| 38
| January 7
| @ Toronto
| 
| Carmelo Anthony (28)
| Hassan Whiteside (16)
| Damian Lillard (9)
| Scotiabank Arena19,800
| 16–22
|- style="background:#fcc;"
| 39
| January 9
| @ Minnesota
| 
| Damian Lillard (20)
| Hassan Whiteside (14)
| Damian Lillard (8)
| Target Center13,720
| 16–23
|- style="background:#fcc;"
| 40
| January 11
| Milwaukee
| 
| Damian Lillard (26)
| Anthony, Tolliver (11)
| McCollum, Lillard (5)
| Moda Center19,843
| 16–24
|- style="background:#cfc;"
| 41
| January 13
| Charlotte
| 
| Damian Lillard (30)
| Tolliver, Whiteside (11)
| Damian Lillard (9)
| Moda Center19,111
| 17–24
|- style="background:#cfc;"
| 42
| January 15
| @ Houston
| 
| Damian Lillard (25)
| Hassan Whiteside (18)
| Damian Lillard (7)
| Toyota Center18,055
| 18–24
|- style="background:#fcc;"
| 43
| January 17
| @ Dallas
| 
| Damian Lillard (34)
| Hassan Whiteside (18)
| Damian Lillard (10)
| American Airlines Center20,283
| 18–25
|- style="background:#fcc;"
| 44
| January 18
| @ Oklahoma City
| 
| Damian Lillard (34)
| Hassan Whiteside (9)
| Damian Lillard (6)
| Chesapeake Energy Arena18,203
| 18–26
|- style="background:#cfc;"
| 45
| January 20
| Golden State
| 
| Damian Lillard (61)
| Hassan Whiteside (21)
| Damian Lillard (7)
| Moda Center19,493
| 19–26
|- style="background:#fcc;"
| 46
| January 23
| Dallas
| 
| Damian Lillard (47)
| Carmelo Anthony (11)
| Damian Lillard (8)
| Moda Center18,574
| 19–27
|- style="background:#cfc;"
| 47
| January 26
| Indiana
| 
| Damian Lillard (50)
| Hassan Whiteside (14)
| Damian Lillard (13)
| Moda Center19,663
| 20–27
|- style="background:#cfc;"
| 48
| January 29
| Houston
| 
| Damian Lillard (36)
| Carmelo Anthony (13)
| Damian Lillard (11)
| Moda Center19,393
| 21–27
|- style="background:#cfc;"
| 49
| January 31
| @ L. A. Lakers
| 
| Damian Lillard (48)
| Hassan Whiteside (13)
| Damian Lillard (10)
| Staples Center18,997
| 22–27

|- style="background:#cfc;"
| 50
| February 1
| Utah
| 
| Damian Lillard (51)
| Hassan Whiteside (21)
| Damian Lillard (12)
| Moda Center19,603
| 23–27
|- style="background:#fcc;"
| 51
| February 4
| @ Denver
| 
| Damian Lillard (21)
| Caleb Swanigan (10)
| Damian Lillard (9)
| Pepsi Center19,520
| 23–28
|- style="background:#cfc;"
| 52
| February 6
| San Antonio
| 
| Damian Lillard (26)
| Hassan Whiteside (23)
| Damian Lillard (10)
| Moda Center19,653
| 24–28
|- style="background:#fcc;"
| 53
| February 7
| @ Utah
| 
| Damian Lillard (42)
| Caleb Swanigan (11)
| Damian Lillard (6)
| Vivint Smart Home Arena18,306
| 24–29
|- style="background:#cfc;"
| 54
| February 9
| Miami
| 
| Damian Lillard (33)
| Hassan Whiteside (17)
| Damian Lillard (8)
| Moda Center19,726
| 25–29
|- style="background:#fcc;"
| 55
| February 11
| @ New Orleans
| 
| Lillard, McCollum (20)
| Hassan Whiteside (14)
| Damian Lillard (6)
| Smoothie King Center15,739
| 25–30
|- style="background:#fcc;"
| 56
| February 12
| @ Memphis
| 
| CJ McCollum (23)
| Carmelo Anthony (15)
| Damian Lillard (10)
| FedExForum16,889
| 25–31
|- align="center"
|colspan="9" bgcolor="#bbcaff"|All-Star Break
|- style="background:#fcc;"
| 57
| February 21
| New Orleans
| 
| CJ McCollum (27)
| Hassan Whiteside (12)
| CJ McCollum (10)
| Moda Center19,946
| 25–32
|- style="background:#cfc;"
| 58
| February 23
| Detroit
| 
| CJ McCollum (41)
| Hassan Whiteside (17)
| CJ McCollum (12)
| Moda Center19,393
| 26–32
|- style="background:#fcc;"
| 59
| February 25
| Boston
| 
| CJ McCollum (28)
| Hassan Whiteside (19)
| CJ McCollum (10)
| Moda Center19,460
| 26–33
|- style="background:#fcc;"
| 60
| February 27
| @ Indiana
| 
| CJ McCollum (28)
| Hassan Whiteside (16)
| CJ McCollum (8)
| Bankers Life Fieldhouse16,872
| 26–34
|- style="background:#fcc;"
| 61
| February 29
| @ Atlanta
| 
| CJ McCollum (35)
| Hassan Whiteside (13)
| CJ McCollum (5)
| State Farm Arena17,765
| 26–35

|- style="background:#cfc;"
| 62
| March 2
| @ Orlando
| 
| CJ McCollum (41)
| Hassan Whiteside (13)
| McCollum, Simons (5) 
| Amway Center18,078
| 27–35
|- style="background:#cfc;"
| 63
| March 4
| Washington
| 
| Carmelo Anthony (25)
| Hassan Whiteside (16)
| Lillard, McCollum (5) 
| Moda Center19,393
| 28–35
|- style="background:#fcc;"
| 64
| March 6
| @ Phoenix
| 
| CJ McCollum (25)
| Hassan Whiteside (20)
| CJ McCollum (8)
| Talking Stick Resort Arena15,522
| 28–36
|- style="background:#fcc;"
| 65
| March 7
| Sacramento
| 
| McCollum, Whiteside (19)
| Hassan Whiteside (11)
| Lillard, McCollum (6)
| Moda Center19,691
| 28–37
|- style="background:#cfc;"
| 66
| March 10
| Phoenix
| 
| Damian Lillard (25)
| Hassan Whiteside (14)
| Damian Lillard (7)
| Moda Center19,393
| 29–37

|- style="background:#cfc;"
| 67
| July 31
| Memphis
| 
| CJ McCollum (33)
| Collins, Nurkic (9)
| Damian Lillard (9)
| The ArenaNo In-Person Attendance
| 30–37
|- style="background:#fcc;"
| 68
| August 2
| @ Boston
| 
| Lillard, Nurkic (30)
| Jusuf Nurkic (9)
| Damian Lillard (16)
| The ArenaNo In-Person Attendance
| 30–38
|- style="background:#cfc;"
| 69
| August 4
| Houston
| 
| Damian Lillard (21)
| Jusuf Nurkic (19)
| Damian Lillard (8)
| The ArenaNo In-Person Attendance
| 31–38
|- style="background:#cfc;"
| 70
| August 6
| @ Denver
| 
| Damian Lillard (45)
| Zach Collins (9)
| Damian Lillard (12)
| Visa Athletic CenterNo In-Person Attendance
| 32–38
|- style="background:#fcc;"
| 71
| August 8
| L. A. Clippers
| 
| CJ McCollum (29)
| Jusuf Nurkic (13)
| Jusuf Nurkic (9)
| HP Field HouseNo In-Person Attendance
| 32–39
|- style="background:#cfc;"
| 72
| August 9
| Philadelphia
| 
| Damian Lillard (51)
| Anthony, Hezonja, McCollum (7)
| Damian Lillard (7)
| Visa Athletic CenterNo In-Person Attendance
| 33–39
|- style="background:#cfc;"
| 73
| August 11
| @ Dallas
| 
| Damian Lillard (61)
| Jusuf Nurkic (9)
| Damian Lillard (8)
| The ArenaNo In-Person Attendance
| 34–39
|- style="background:#cfc;"
| 74
| August 13
| @ Brooklyn
| 
| Damian Lillard (42)
| Jusuf Nurkic (10)
| Damian Lillard (12)
| The ArenaNo In-Person Attendance
| 35–39

|- style="background:#;"
| 67
| March 12
| @ Memphis
| 
| 
| 
| 
| Moda Center
| 
|- style="background:#;"
| 68
| March 15
| Houston
| 
| 
| 
| 
| Moda Center
| 
|- style="background:#;"
| 69
| March 17
| Minnesota
| 
| 
| 
| 
| Moda Center
| 
|- style="background:#;"
| 70
| March 19
| Dallas
| 
| 
| 
| 
| Moda Center
| 
|- style="background:#;"
| 71
| March 22
| @ Minnesota
| 
| 
| 
| 
| Target Center
| 
|- style="background:#;"
| 72
| March 24
| @ Charlotte
| 
| 
| 
| 
| Spectrum Center
| 
|- style="background:#;"
| 73
| March 25
| @ Detroit
| 
| 
| 
| 
| Little Caesars Arena
| 
|- style="background:#;"
| 74
| March 27
| @ Boston
| 
| 
| 
| 
| TD Garden
| 
|- style="background:#;"
| 75
| March 29
| @ Philadelphia
| 
| 
| 
| 
| Wells Fargo Center
| 
|- style="background:#;"
| 76
| March 30
| @ Brooklyn
| 
| 
| 
| 
| Barclays Center
| 
|- style="background:#;"
| 77
| April 2
| Utah
| 
| 
| 
| 
| Moda Center
| 
|- style="background:#;"
| 78
| April 5
| Memphis
| 
| 
| 
| 
| Moda Center
| 
|- style="background:#;"
| 79
| April 7
| Cleveland
| 
| 
| 
| 
| Moda Center
| 
|- style="background:#;"
| 80
| April 9
| Denver
| 
| 
| 
| 
| Moda Center
| 
|- style="background:#;"
| 81
| April 13
| @ Golden State
| 
| 
| 
| 
| Chase Center
| 
|- style="background:#;"
| 82
| April 15
| LA Clippers
| 
| 
| 
| 
| Moda Center
|

Play-in

|- style="background:#cfc;"
| 1
| August 15
| Memphis
| 
| Damian Lillard (31)
| Jusuf Nurkic (21)
| Damian Lillard (10)
| HP Field HouseNo In-person Attendance
| 1–0

Playoffs

|- style="background:#cfc;"
| 1
| August 18
| @ L. A. Lakers
| 
| Damian Lillard (34)
| Jusuf Nurkic (15)
| Anthony, Lillard (5)
| The ArenaNo In-Person Attendance
| 1–0
|- style="background:#fcc;"
| 2
| August 20
| @ L. A. Lakers
| 
| Damian Lillard (18)
| Hassan Whiteside (9)
| CJ McCollum (3)
| The ArenaNo In-Person Attendance
| 1–1
|- style="background:#fcc;"
| 3
| August 22
| L. A. Lakers
| 
| Damian Lillard (34)
| McCollum, Whiteside (8)
| Damian Lillard (7)
| The ArenaNo In-Person Attendance
| 1–2
|- style="background:#fcc;"
| 4
| August 24
| L. A. Lakers
| 
| Jusuf Nurkic (20)
| Jusuf Nurkic (13)
| Anfernee Simons (6)
| The ArenaNo In-Person Attendance
| 1–3
|- style="background:#fcc;"
| 5
| August 29
| @ L. A. Lakers
| 
| CJ McCollum (36)
| Jusuf Nurkic (10)
| CJ McCollum (7)
| The ArenaNo In-Person Attendance
| 1–4

Transactions

Trades

Free agency

Re-signed

Additions

Subtractions

References

Portland Trail Blazers seasons
Portland Trail Blazers
Portland Trail Blazers
Portland Trail Blazers
Portland
Portland